Peter Daube (born 1964) is a New Zealand film, television, stage and voice actor. Daube graduated from Toi Whakaari: New Zealand Drama School in 1992 with a Diploma in Acting, and upgraded it to a Bachelor of Performing Arts (Acting) in 2010. Two of his better-known roles to date are that of Ozul in Maddigan's Quest, and the voice of Sculpin in Power Rangers Mystic Force. In 2018 Daube appeared in the Sydney pop-up Globe's production of The Merchant of Venice as Shylock.

Filmography

Film

Television

Theatre

References

External links

1964 births
Living people
New Zealand male film actors
New Zealand male soap opera actors
New Zealand male television actors
New Zealand male voice actors
20th-century New Zealand male actors
21st-century New Zealand male actors

Toi Whakaari alumni